The Col. William Kelly House is a historic house located at 36 Tudor Place in Buffalo, New York, United States.

Description and history 
It is a Colonial Revival style brick dwelling constructed in 1937. It has a modified square plan with a three bay front featuring a pedimented center entrance with a finely detailed Adamesque surround and engaged Doric order columns.

It was listed on the National Register of Historic Places on May 23, 1997. It is located in the Elmwood Historic District–East.

References

External links
Col. William Kelly House - U.S. National Register of Historic Places on Waymarking.com

Colonial Revival architecture in New York (state)
Historic district contributing properties in Erie County, New York
Houses completed in 1937
Houses in Buffalo, New York
Houses on the National Register of Historic Places in New York (state)
National Register of Historic Places in Buffalo, New York